There are a number of listed buildings in Lancashire. The term "listed building", in the United Kingdom, refers to a building or structure designated as being of special architectural, historical, or cultural significance. Details of all the listed buildings are contained in the National Heritage List for England. They are categorised in three grades: Grade I consists of buildings of outstanding architectural or historical interest, Grade II* includes significant buildings of more than local interest and Grade II consists of buildings of special architectural or historical interest. Buildings in England are listed by the Secretary of State for Culture, Media and Sport on recommendations provided by English Heritage, which also determines the grading.

Some listed buildings are looked after by the National Trust or English Heritage while others are in private ownership or administered by trusts.

There are over 5000 listed structures in Lancashire. Although most structures on the lists are buildings, other structures such as bridges, monuments, sculptures, war memorials, milestones and mileposts or telephone kiosks may be listed. In Lancashire 70 structures are classified as Grade I (buildings of outstanding architectural or historic interest) and 256 are classified as Grade II* (particularly significant buildings of more than local interest). The remaining 4901 are classified as Grade II.

Listed buildings by grade
Grade I listed buildings in Lancashire
Grade I listed churches in Lancashire
Grade II* listed buildings in Lancashire

Listed buildings by district or unitary authority
Within each local government district, buildings are listed by civil parish or unparished area.

Blackburn with Darwen

Listed buildings in Blackburn
Listed buildings in Darwen
Listed buildings in Eccleshill, Lancashire
Listed buildings in Hoddlesden
Listed buildings in Livesey
Listed buildings in North Turton
Listed buildings in Pleasington
Listed buildings in Tockholes
Listed buildings in Yate and Pickup Bank

Blackpool

Listed buildings in Blackpool

Burnley

Listed buildings in Briercliffe
Listed buildings in Burnley
Listed buildings in Cliviger
Listed buildings in Habergham Eaves
Listed buildings in Hapton, Lancashire
Listed buildings in Ightenhill
Listed buildings in Padiham
Listed buildings in Worsthorne-with-Hurstwood

Chorley

Listed buildings in Adlington, Lancashire
Listed buildings in Anderton, Lancashire
Listed buildings in Anglezarke
Listed buildings in Bretherton
Listed buildings in Brindle, Lancashire
Listed buildings in Charnock Richard
Listed buildings in Chorley
Listed buildings in Clayton-le-Woods
Listed buildings in Coppull
Listed buildings in Croston
Listed buildings in Cuerden
Listed buildings in Eccleston, Lancashire
Listed buildings in Euxton
Listed buildings in Heapey
Listed buildings in Heath Charnock
Listed buildings in Heskin
Listed buildings in Hoghton
Listed buildings in Mawdesley
Listed buildings in Rivington
Listed buildings in Ulnes Walton
Listed buildings in Wheelton
Listed buildings in Whittle-le-Woods
Listed buildings in Withnell

Fylde

Listed buildings in Bryning-with-Warton
Listed buildings in Elswick, Lancashire
Listed buildings in Freckleton
Listed buildings in Greenhalgh-with-Thistleton
Listed buildings in Kirkham, Lancashire
Listed buildings in Little Eccleston-with-Larbreck
Listed buildings in Lytham
Listed buildings in Medlar-with-Wesham
Listed buildings in Newton-with-Clifton
Listed buildings in Ribby-with-Wrea
Listed buildings in Saint Anne's on the Sea
Listed buildings in Singleton, Lancashire
Listed buildings in Staining, Lancashire
Listed buildings in Treales, Roseacre and Wharles
Listed buildings in Weeton-with-Preese
Listed buildings in Westby-with-Plumptons

Hyndburn

Listed buildings in Accrington
Listed buildings in Altham, Lancashire
Listed buildings in Church, Lancashire
Listed buildings in Clayton-le-Moors
Listed buildings in Great Harwood
Listed buildings in Oswaldtwistle
Listed buildings in Rishton

Lancaster

Listed buildings in Arkholme-with-Cawood
Listed buildings in Bolton-le-Sands
Listed buildings in Borwick
Listed buildings in Burrow-with-Burrow
Listed buildings in Cantsfield
Listed buildings in Carnforth
Listed buildings in Caton-with-Littledale
Listed buildings in Claughton, Lancaster
Listed buildings in Cockerham
Listed buildings in Ellel, Lancashire
Listed buildings in Gressingham
Listed buildings in Halton-with-Aughton
Listed buildings in Heaton-with-Oxcliffe
Listed buildings in Heysham
Listed buildings in Hornby-with-Farleton
Listed buildings in Ireby, Lancashire
Listed buildings in Lancaster, Lancashire
Listed buildings in Leck, Lancashire
Listed buildings in Melling-with-Wrayton
Listed buildings in Middleton, Lancashire
Listed buildings in Morecambe
Listed buildings in Nether Kellet
Listed buildings in Over Kellet
Listed buildings in Over Wyresdale
Listed buildings in Overton, Lancashire
Listed buildings in Priest Hutton
Listed buildings in Quernmore
Listed buildings in Roeburndale
Listed buildings in Scotforth
Listed buildings in Silverdale, Lancashire
Listed buildings in Slyne-with-Hest
Listed buildings in Tatham, Lancashire
Listed buildings in Thurnham, Lancashire
Listed buildings in Tunstall, Lancashire
Listed buildings in Warton, Lancaster
Listed buildings in Wennington, Lancashire
Listed buildings in Whittington, Lancashire
Listed buildings in Wray-with-Botton
Listed buildings in Yealand Conyers
Listed buildings in Yealand Redmayne

Pendle

Listed buildings in Barley-with-Wheatley Booth
Listed buildings in Barnoldswick
Listed buildings in Barrowford
Listed buildings in Blacko
Listed buildings in Bracewell and Brogden
Listed buildings in Brierfield, Lancashire
Listed buildings in Colne
Listed buildings in Earby
Listed buildings in Foulridge
Listed buildings in Goldshaw Booth
Listed buildings in Higham with West Close Booth
Listed buildings in Kelbrook and Sough
Listed buildings in Laneshaw Bridge
Listed buildings in Nelson, Lancashire
Listed buildings in Old Laund Booth
Listed buildings in Reedley Hallows
Listed buildings in Roughlee Booth
Listed buildings in Salterforth
Listed buildings in Trawden Forest

Preston

Listed buildings in Barton, Preston
Listed buildings in Broughton, Lancashire
Listed buildings in Goosnargh
Listed buildings in Grimsargh
Listed buildings in Haighton
Listed buildings in Lea, Lancashire
Listed buildings in Preston, Lancashire
Listed buildings in Whittingham, Lancashire
Listed buildings in Woodplumpton

Ribble Valley

Listed buildings in Aighton, Bailey and Chaigley
Listed buildings in Balderstone, Lancashire
Listed buildings in Bashall Eaves
Listed buildings in Billington and Langho
Listed buildings in Bolton-by-Bowland
Listed buildings in Bowland Forest High
Listed buildings in Bowland Forest Low
Listed buildings in Bowland-with-Leagram
Listed buildings in Chatburn
Listed buildings in Chipping, Lancashire
Listed buildings in Clayton-le-Dale
Listed buildings in Clitheroe
Listed buildings in Downham, Lancashire
Listed buildings in Dutton, Lancashire
Listed buildings in Easington, Lancashire
Listed buildings in Gisburn
Listed buildings in Gisburn Forest
Listed buildings in Great Mitton
Listed buildings in Grindleton
Listed buildings in Horton, Lancashire
Listed buildings in Hothersall
Listed buildings in Little Mitton
Listed buildings in Longridge
Listed buildings in Mearley
Listed buildings in Mellor, Lancashire
Listed buildings in Middop
Listed buildings in Newsholme, Lancashire
Listed buildings in Newton, Ribble Valley
Listed buildings in Osbaldeston
Listed buildings in Paythorne
Listed buildings in Pendleton, Lancashire
Listed buildings in Read, Lancashire
Listed buildings in Ribchester
Listed buildings in Rimington
Listed buildings in Sabden
Listed buildings in Salesbury
Listed buildings in Sawley, Lancashire
Listed buildings in Simonstone, Lancashire
Listed buildings in Slaidburn
Listed buildings in Thornley-with-Wheatley
Listed buildings in Twiston
Listed buildings in Waddington, Lancashire
Listed buildings in West Bradford, Lancashire
Listed buildings in Whalley, Lancashire
Listed buildings in Wiswell
Listed buildings in Worston

Rossendale

Listed buildings in Bacup
Listed buildings in Haslingden
Listed buildings in Rawtenstall
Listed buildings in Whitworth, Lancashire

South Ribble

Listed buildings in Cuerdale
Listed buildings in Farington
Listed buildings in Hutton, Lancashire
Listed buildings in Leyland, Lancashire
Listed buildings in Little Hoole
Listed buildings in Longton, Lancashire
Listed buildings in Much Hoole
Listed buildings in Penwortham
Listed buildings in Samlesbury
Listed buildings in Walton-le-Dale

West Lancashire

Listed buildings in Aughton, Lancashire
Listed buildings in Bickerstaffe
Listed buildings in Bispham, West Lancashire
Listed buildings in Burscough
Listed buildings in Dalton, Lancashire
Listed buildings in Downholland
Listed buildings in Great Altcar
Listed buildings in Halsall
Listed buildings in Hesketh-with-Becconsall
Listed buildings in Hilldale
Listed buildings in Lathom
Listed buildings in Lathom South
Listed buildings in Newburgh, Lancashire
Listed buildings in Ormskirk
Listed buildings in Parbold
Listed buildings in Rufford, Lancashire
Listed buildings in Scarisbrick
Listed buildings in Skelmersdale
Listed buildings in Tarleton
Listed buildings in Upholland
Listed buildings in Wrightington

Wyre
Listed buildings in Barnacre-with-Bonds
Listed buildings in Bleasdale
Listed buildings in Cabus
Listed buildings in Catterall
Listed buildings in Claughton, Wyre
Listed buildings in Fleetwood
Listed buildings in Forton, Lancashire
Listed buildings in Garstang
Listed buildings in Great Eccleston
Listed buildings in Hambleton, Lancashire
Listed buildings in Inskip-with-Sowerby
Listed buildings in Kirkland, Lancashire
Listed buildings in Myerscough and Bilsborrow
Listed buildings in Nateby, Lancashire
Listed buildings in Nether Wyresdale
Listed buildings in Out Rawcliffe
Listed buildings in Pilling
Listed buildings in Poulton-le-Fylde
Listed buildings in Preesall
Listed buildings in Stalmine-with-Staynall
Listed buildings in Thornton-Cleveleys
Listed buildings in Upper Rawcliffe-with-Tarnacre
Listed buildings in Winmarleigh

Former listed buildings
 Greaves Hall, North Meols (demolished 2009)

References

External links
Blackpool Civic Trust website
 National Trust website